In the area of mathematics called combinatorial group theory, the Schreier coset graph is a graph associated with a group G, a generating set {xi : i in I } of G, and a subgroup H ≤ G. The Schreier graph encodes the abstract structure of a group modulo an equivalence relation formed by the coset.

The graph is named after Otto Schreier, who used the term “Nebengruppenbild”. An equivalent definition was made in an early paper of Todd and Coxeter.

Description
The vertices of the graph are the right cosets Hg = {hg : h in H } for g in G.  

The edges of the graph are of the form (Hg, Hgxi).  

The Cayley graph of the group G with {xi : i in I } is the Schreier coset graph for H = {1G} .  

A spanning tree of a Schreier coset graph corresponds to a Schreier transversal, as in Schreier's subgroup lemma .

The book "Categories and Groupoids" listed below relates this to the theory of covering morphisms of groupoids.  A subgroup H of a group G determines a covering morphism of groupoids   and if X is a generating set for G then its inverse image under p is the Schreier graph of (G, X).

Applications
The graph is useful to understand coset enumeration and the Todd–Coxeter algorithm.  

Coset graphs can be used to form large permutation representations of groups and were used by Graham Higman to show that the alternating groups of large enough degree are Hurwitz groups, .

Every vertex-transitive graph is a coset graph.

References 

 
 
 
 Schreier graphs of the Basilica group Authors: Daniele D'Angeli, Alfredo Donno, Michel Matter, Tatiana Nagnibeda
 Philip J. Higgins, Categories and Groupoids, van Nostrand, New York, Lecture Notes, 1971, Republished as TAC Reprint, 2005 

Combinatorial group theory